Żerków  (German: Zerkow, 1943–1945 Bergstadt (Kr. Jarotschin)) is a town in Jarocin County, Greater Poland Voivodeship, Poland, with 2,076 inhabitants (2004). It is located 53 kilometers east of the regional capital of Poznań.

The town is near the Żerków-Czeszewo Landscape Park.

History

The oldest known mention of Żerków comes from a document of Duke Bolesław the Pious from 1257, and in a document of Duke and future King of Poland Przemysł II from 1283 it was already referred to as a town. Żerków was a private town of Polish nobility, administratively located in the Pyzdry County in the Kalisz Voivodeship in the Greater Poland Province of the Polish Crown. In 1574, the newly elected King Henry of Valois stopped in Żerków before his royal coronation in Kraków. In 1623 the town was visited by King Sigismund III Vasa and prince royal (and future king) Władysław IV Vasa.

The Radomicki noble family erected the Baroque Church of Saint Stanislaus, which is the town's greatest historic landmark.

Following the Second Partition of Poland Żerków became a part of Prussia. From 1815 until 1920 it was a part of the Province of Posen.  In 1905, Żerków had 1631 inhabitants.

As a consequence of the Treaty of Versailles, the town became a part of the newly founded Second Polish Republic.

After the joint German-Soviet invasion of Poland, which started World War II, it was occupied by Germany in 1939. All residents of Jewish origin were expelled from the town soon after the arrival of the Germans. Żerków was used by the Germans as a resort spot for soldiers. In the years 1941-44 the Jewish cemetery was destroyed and its tombstones used as construction material. In 1943, the Germans renamed the town Bergstadt to erase traces of Polish origin. In 1945, the German occupation ended and the historic name was restored.

In 1962 a telecommunication tower of reinforced concrete similar to that at Piątkowo, Poznań was built.

Sports
The local football team is GKS Żerków. It competes in the lower leagues.

People 
 Albert Wojciech Adamkiewicz
 Heinrich Graetz
 Jakob Steinhardt
 Henry Heppner

References

Further reading 
Maksymilian Łukaszewicz: Strażnica Ostrów i miasto Żerków. Poznań 1891

Cities and towns in Greater Poland Voivodeship
Jarocin County
Shtetls